Artemio Precioso (born Hellin, 1891 – died Madrid, 1945) was a Spanish writer and editor. He was an indefatigable entrepreneur, founding numerous newspapers, magazines and editorial houses in his career. He was one of the guiding lights behind the fiction collection known as La Novela de Hoy (The Novel of Today) which consisted of more than 500 volumes. He was followed in this mission by Pedro Sainz Rodríguez. He also ran the humour magazine Muchas Gracias.

Precioso was a Republican by political inclination. As a novelist, he wrote popular (often erotic) fiction for the masses. Among his numerous titles in the 1920s and the 1930s were: Rosa de carne, Vivir dos veces, La virgen casada, El doctor y su amiga, El crimen del otro, El hijo legal, El juego de la vida, Por qué engañan ellas, Pasión y muerte, Cuando el amor nace, El légamo de la tragedia, El millonario polígamo, El triunfo de Carmela, Judías verdes, Isabel Clara, La doble pasión, La muerte de un señorito juerguista, La que suiso ser libre, La tragedia del gordo, La verdadera mujer, La vida estéril (Tierra baldía), El crimen de un celoso, Memorias de un médico, ¡Lavó su honra!, Evas y manzanas, Los nuevos ricos de la moral, etc.

His last years were difficult ones, as his publishing ventures collapsed due to a conflict with the dictator Miguel Primo de Rivera. A satirical story by Ramon Valle-Inclan had displeased the dictator. Precioso was one of the intellectuals who were part of the "Decadentismo" movement in Spanish culture. The others were Antonio de Hoyos y Vinent, Álvaro Retana and Ramón María del Valle-Inclán. Apart from Valle-Inclan, the rest fled to Paris. Precioso was a literary translator as well; he translated from French the works of Emmanuel Bove, Maurice Constantin Weyer and André Maurois, and from English Volpone by Ben Jonson. He had a son, Artemio Precioso Ugarte, who fought as a communist militant in the Spanish Civil War and was forced to emigrate to the USSR in 1939. The son later became a respected economist and ecologist.

References

Spanish male novelists
Male journalists
Spanish publishers (people)
20th-century Spanish novelists
People from Hellín
1891 births
1945 deaths
20th-century Spanish male writers
Civil governors of Toledo
20th-century Spanish journalists